Agoo, officially the Municipality of Agoo, is a 1st class municipality in the province of La Union, Philippines. According to the 2020 census, it has a population of 66,028 people.

Etymology
The name agoo is usually attributed to "aroo" or "agoho," a pine-like evergreen tree (Casuarina equisetifolia or Whistling Pine) that thrived in the western coast during the pre-Spanish Period.

History
Agoo's administrative dates back further than most Philippine municipalities, with the town being established within the same decade that the Spanish colonizers arrived on the Island of Luzon.  The history of the settlement now known as Agoo dates back even further, with both documentary and artifactual evidence supporting the assertion that it was a major port of call for foreign traders before it was formally established by the Spaniards.

Early history
Before the arrival of European colonizers, Agoo, a trading port of Luyag na Caboloan (modern day-Pangasinan), was already a coastal maritime trading center for Northwestern Luzon, because its coast was shaped in such a way that it was a good harbor for foreign vessels coming into Lingayen Gulf. Gold mined from the Cordillera Mountain Range, coming down from the Aringay-Tonglo-Balatok gold trail, was traded in Agoo as well as its neighbor settlement in Aringay.

Evidence of trade between Agoo and China has been excavated in the form of porcelain and pottery pieces unearthed at the site of the Catholic church during its renovation, - which are now kept in the Museo de Iloko.

Japanese fishermen eventually established their first settlement in the Philippines at Agoo, passing on their fishing skills and technologies to the local populace.

By the time the Spanish first arrived to colonize Luzon, they noted that Agoo was inhabited by people of the "same race as those of Pangasinan," and Agoo was originally made part of that Pangasinan province until the Spanish authorities decided to create a new province, La Union, bringing together towns from Pangasinan and Ilocos Sur.

Spanish colonial era

Sighting by Juan de Salcedo
In 1572, Juan de Salcedo, fresh from his conquest of Southern Luzon,  was ordered by Miguel Lopez de Legazpi to explore Northern Luzon and "pacify the people in it".

In June 1572, he was traversing the Angalakan River, when he saw and attacked three Japanese ships. When they fled, Salcedo followed them until they landed at a Japanese settlement. After paying tributes, the Japanese were allowed to remain. These Japanese would leave when the port of Agoo was later closed, but not without first teaching the natives their methods of fish culture, rice cultivation, deerskin tanning, duck breeding, and weapons manufacturing.

Establishment by the Franciscans 
A permanent settlement was established in Agoo in 1578 when two Franciscan Missionaries, Fray Juan Bautista Lucarelli of Italy and Fray Sebastian de Baeza of Spain, constructed a thatch and bamboo church in honor of Saint Francis of Assisi. Agoo encompassed a vast land area that spanned the modern-day towns of Rosario, Santo Tomas, Tubao, Pugo, Aringay, Caba, Bauang, and the place called "Atuley" or present-day San Juan.  Agoo became the center of the campaign of pacification and conquest, not only of the surrounding towns that would later become La Union but of the mountain tribes in the Cordilleras as well.

The two missionaries formally proclaimed Agoo as a civic unit. naming it after the river along whose banks it was built.  At the time, the riverbank was forested with pine-like trees locally called "aroo" or "agoho" (Casuarina equisetifolia, or Whistling Pine).

In another claim of the town's name origin, Agoo was said to be derived from a variety of flying fish (chileopogon agoo), thus "agoo," by which Japanese settlers called it thereafter.

El Puerto de Japon 
During the early years of the Spanish colonial period, Agoo continued to be an important point of trade with Japan.  Miguel De Loarca referred to Agoo as "El Puerto de Japon"  - the Japanese Port.

Rosario Mendoza-Cortes, in her book "Pangasinan 1572-1800" notes that Agoo was the region's primary port of call for Japanese and Chinese traders - with the only other contender for the honor being Sual, Pangasinan. This was because there was a Japanese colony there. After all, traders at Agoo would have access to a greater number of people, and it was nearer to China and Japan. The main product traded from the area was the deer pelt, which was shipped to Japan.

Agoo's role as a port deteriorated when the Spanish closed the Philippines to foreign trade.  When foreign trade was allowed again, the shape of the gulf had changed and it was thus Sual that became the dominant port.

Development by the Augustinians
Most of the town's early development can be attributed to the efforts of the Augustinian Order. They took over from the Franciscans and administered the town off and on throughout the Spanish occupation until the secular priests took over in 1898.

They changed the town's patron saint to Santa Monica. They established a school where reading, writing, industrial works, and catechism were taught. They relocated the town center, laid out the streets and public buildings, and established roads leading to the nearby towns.

To facilitate the construction of churches, public buildings, and bridges, they taught the people brick and lime making, brick-laying, and stone-quarrying. They introduced the "moro-moro", the singing of "pasyon", new farm implement, and new plants.

Father Aquilino Garcia constructed a church, and by the end of the 15th century, the image of Nuestra Señora de Caridad (Our Lady of Charity) was installed in it.  This church was destroyed in 1796 and a new one was built when the original settlement was moved to what has ever since been the town center. The church was then claimed to be the largest and grandest in northern Luzon during that time. Ruins are scattered throughout the town's center and some are visible at this point.

Battle of Agoo (1661) 

In 1661, Andres Malong of Pangasinan failed to recover La Union from the Spaniards after the Battle of Agoo.

1849 Integration into La Union 
On October 29, 1849, Governor General Claveria issued a promovido to fuse the Pangasinan-Ilocos-Cordillera areas into La Union. On March 2, 1850, Governor General Antonio Maria Blanco signed the Superior Decreto of La Union  (34th province from Cebu-1565), with Captain Toribio Ruiz de la Escalera as the first Gobernador Military y Politico. Isabella II of Spain decreed the province's creation on April 18, 1854.

The new province comprised the north-western towns of Pangasinan and the towns of Ilocos Sur south of the Amburayan river. Agoo was the oldest town to be integrated and was listed as having a population of 6,936 people.

World War II 

In the early morning of 22 December 1941, Agoo was one of three beachheads taken by the invasion force of General Masaharu Homma during the Japanese Invasion of Lingayen Gulf.

The Japanese 47th Infantry and 4th Tank Regiment were confronted by heavy weather, however, and were thus delayed and dispersed.  They landed at about 7:30 A.M. on a four-mile stretch of beach all the way from Agoo to just north of Damortis.

Agoo is thus recorded in WWII annals as one of the Japanese staging points for the Battle of Rosario.

Martial law 

President Ferdinand Marcos' 1972 declaration of martial law had little political effect within Agoo itself, although there were some Agoo natives, such as then-Davao Archbishop Antonio L. Mabutas, who spoke against the human rights abuses during martial law.

Marcos had strong political ties to La Union, notably Jose D. Aspiras whom he appointed as Tourism Minister. He also allowed the powerful family factions which had dominated La Union politics since before the American colonial era to stay in place.  Marcos' efforts to consolidate political power did not get much resistance in the La Union, including Agoo, since Marcos' use of violent methods for stifling dissent thus mostly took place in other, non-Ilocano provinces, such as nearby Abra, Kalinga, and Mountain Province.

Since Bishop Mabutas was in Davao at the time, though, he was aware of human rights abuses in that city, particularly the torture and killings of church workers.  The pastoral letter he wrote against Martial law, "Reign of Terror in the Countryside," is notable for having been the first pastoral to be written against Marcos' martial law administration, and even doubly so because Mabutas was considered a conservative within the Catholic church heirarchy in the Philippines.

1980s and 1990s

Establishment of High School and University 

On July 23, 1945, the Municipal government, then led by Mayor Miguel Fontanilla, established South Provincial High School in response to education-oriented citizen Ramon Mabutas' calls for the establishment of a public high school. South Provincial High School turned Agoo into a center of education for Southern La Union and became one of the constituent state-run schools that were combined by Presidential Decree 1778 to create the Don Mariano Marcos Memorial State University in 1981.

After the 1986 EDSA Revolution 

After the February 1986 People Power Revolution, President Corazon Aquino placed the Philippines under a revolutionary government until the 1987 Constitution of the Philippines could be ratified.  During this time, the Municipality of Agoo was placed under the administration of OIC Mayor Antonio Q. Estrada.

1990 Luzon Earthquake 

At 4.26 P.M. on July 16, 1990, Agoo was hit by the 1990 Luzon earthquake, and was one of the most severely affected locales.

The Basilica Minore of Our Lady of Charity was badly damaged, and the bell tower which was then the only remaining structure from the 1893 church, crashed completely. The Agoo municipal building collapsed completely, killing numerous citizens who were inside because they were in line to pay in time for the national income tax deadline for that quarter. Numerous tombs in the municipal cemetery were fractured open.

Alleged Marian Apparitions

The town gained media attention in the early 1990s for the alleged Marian apparitions of the Blessed Virgin Mary to Judiel Nieva. Nieva reported seeing the Virgin Mary, popularly known as Our Lady of Agoo atop a Guava tree, a statue weeping with blood became highly sensationalized. Religious pilgrimages among Filipino Catholics increased by the millions as people flocked to see the phenomenon. The alleged apparition and healing events came into the attention of the Catholic Bishops' Conference of the Philippines, who in turn began an investigation and later released an ecclesiastical ruling that the apparitions were non-supernatural in origin in 1993.

Recent history

Failed proposed merger of Agoo and Aringay 
On June 11, 2014, then-representative Eufranio Eriguel filed House Bill 4644 to establish the first city in the second district by merging the municipalities of Agoo and Aringay.  The bill was co-authored by La Union first district Rep. Victor Ortega and Abono party-list Rep. Francisco Emmanuel Ortega III, and was deemed necessary because neither Aringay nor Agoo alone could meet the requirements to create a Philippine city: a population of 150,000; an annual income of P100 million minimum a year; and a land area of 100 square kilometers. (As of 2014, the national census showed that Agoo and Aringay have about 65,000 and 47,500 residents, respectively. Agoo posted more than P90 million, and Aringay made P15,000 million in annual earnings, respectively)

The proposed city would have two districts under a city mayor and city vice mayor along with 14 councilors in the Sangguniang Panlungsod, new positions for which the former municipal officials could run despite having the terms limits of their offices.

The proposed bill sparked protests from the people of both Agoo and Aringay who did not want the merger because it would subject them to the same high local taxes as Agoo and because of concerns that Agoo and Aringay would lose their cultural identities.  The proposed merger did not push through within term of the 16th Congress.

Election and Drug Related Violence (2010-2018)
Since 2010, either the Municipality Agoo has been regularly declared an election hotspot due to incidences of violence during national and local election periods.  Major incidents include the murder of former Tubao Vice Mayor Lazaro Gayo outside his law office near Agoo's Municipal Hall, and an alleged assassination attempt on Tubao Mayor Dante Garcia in the same year; and an alleged assassination attempt on former Congressman Eufranio Eriguel in 2016.

Media attributed the violence to "intense rivalry" between incumbent Congressman Eufranio Eriguel and his 2010 opposing candidate, former Rep. Thomas Dumpit Jr., and later to "clashes between the followers" of Congressman Eriguel and his 2013 opponent, former Army General Mario Chan.

In 2013, the declaration of the towns Tubao, Agoo, Caba, and Aringay as election hotspots compelled the Philippine National Police to temporarily remove the police chiefs of the four towns during the election period, a decision which was protested by incumbent politicians in both towns, including then-Congressman Eriguel and his wife, then-Mayor Sandra Eriguel.

Also during the 2010s, a number of drug-related incidents in Agoo came to national attention. This resulted in the sacking of the police chief of Agoo, along with those of the Southern La Union towns of Bauang, Naguilan, and Tubao.

On August 16, 2016, former Congressman Eriguel was included by Philippine President Rodrigo Duterte as one of the local government officials and legislators allegedly involved in illegal drug trade in his "I am sorry for my country" speech. Eriguel and a number of other Southern La Union politicians denied these allegations.

On May 12, 2018, Eriguel and two others were gunned down by unknown assailants in an ambush during an event for the 2018 Barangay elections.

Geography
Agoo and La Union are part of the Ilocos Region, which is located on the narrow plain between the Cordillera Central and the South China Sea.  Agoo itself is one of the southern municipalities and is bounded on the north by Aringay, on the east by the municipality of Tubao further up the foothills of the Cordilleras, and on the south by Santo Tomas.  Agoo's western shores consist of a long beach facing Lingayen Gulf and South China Sea.

The Agoo River, which is sometimes wrongly named the Principe River after the Taytay Principe Bridge which traverses it along the main highway, flows through the town from uphill in the east to where it meets the South China Sea in the west.

Barangays
Agoo is divided into 49 barangays. These barangays are headed by elected officials: Barangay Captain, Barangay Council, whose members are called Barangay Councilors. All are elected every three years.

 Ambitacay
 Balawarte
 Capas
 Consolacion (Poblacion)
 Macalva Central
 Macalva Norte
 Macalva Sur
 Nazareno
 Purok
 San Agustin East
 San Agustin Norte
 San Agustin Sur
 San Antonino
 San Antonio
 San Francisco
 San Isidro
 San Joaquin Norte
 San Joaquin Sur
 San Jose Norte
 San Jose Sur
 San Juan
 San Julian Central
 San Julian East
 San Julian Norte
 San Julian West
 San Manuel Norte
 San Manuel Sur
 San Marcos
 San Miguel
 San Nicolas Central (Poblacion)
 San Nicolas East
 San Nicolas Norte (Poblacion)
 San Nicolas Sur (Poblacion)
 San Nicolas West
 San Pedro
 San Roque East
 San Vicente Norte
 San Vicente Sur
 Santa Ana
 Santa Barbara (Poblacion)
 Santa Fe
 Santa Maria
 Santa Monica
 Santa Rita (Nalinac)
 Santa Rita East
 Santa Rita Norte
 Santa Rita Sur
 Santa Rita West
 San Roque West

Climate

Geology 
According to findings of the Philippine Rice Research Institute, Agoo's land consists mostly of the San Manuel (a dark grayish brown sandy loam characterized by medium compactness and a Ph ranging from highly acidic to slightly alkaline), Maligaya (dark grayish brown clay loam with course fragments of soft powdery red and black concretions, characterized by medium compactness and a neutral to slightly alkaline Ph), Bauang (dark grayish brown clay loam with course fragments of highly weathered stratified shales and sandstones characterized by strongly acidic to slightly acidic Ph), and Annam (brown clay loam with course fragments of partially and highly weathered rock or gravel and yellowish brown Iron and Magnesium concretions, characterized by an extremely to slightly acidic Ph) type soils.

Demographics

Economy

Government
Just as the national government, the municipal government of Agoo, is divided into three branches: executive, legislative, and judiciary. The judicial branch is administered solely by the Supreme Court of the Philippines. The LGUs have control of the executive and legislative branches.

The executive branch is composed of the mayor and the barangay captain for the barangays.Local Government Code of the Philippines, Book III, Department of the Interior and Local Government official website.

The legislative branch is composed of the Sangguniang Bayan (town assembly), Sangguniang Barangay (barangay council), and the Sangguniang Kabataan for the youth sector.

The seat of Government is vested upon the Mayor and other elected officers who hold office at the Townhall. The Sangguniang Bayan is the center of legislation, stationed in Agoo Municipio.

Elected officials

Tourism

Agoo has interesting attractions and main festival/events:

Cultural and Architectural Attractions 
 Basilica Minore of Our Lady of Charity
 Museo de Iloko -  The 1979 Museo de La Union or Museo Iloko was the former Presidencia of Agoo (restored by the Philippine Tourism Authority in 1981).
 Eagle of the North Park - a giant eagle structure designed by Arch. Anselmo Day-ag as a Symbol of Marcoses' power.
 Agoo Presidencia and New Town Hall
 Agoo Welcome Arch (1578) 
 Plaza de la Virgen
 Don Mariano Marcos Memorial State University (Marcos Sports Center) DMMMSU-South La Union Campus
 Imelda Garden (fishermen sculpture, Agoo Town Square and Town Plaza)
 Jose D. Aspiras ancestral house
 Jose D. Aspiras Civic Center
 Our Lady of Lourdes Grotto

Nature Attractions 
 Agoo–Damortis Protected Landscape and Seascape
 Agoo Ecopark (Sta. Rita West/Central)
 Agoo beach (San Nicolas East)
 Camp Wagi (Brgy. Capas)
 San Antonio-San Miguel Eco-Mountain Trail

Festivals 
 Dinengdeng festival and Patronal Town Fiesta (8th, April 26 to May 4, 2012 - "Lifting Agoo to New Heights Through Dynamic, Dedicated and Visionary Leadership."  101 Dinengdeng recipes, an Agoo/Ilocano vegetable delicacy of Ilocanos festivity meant DMMMSU-South La Union Campus Grandstand, Agoo)
 Agoo Kilawin (Ceviche) Festival, December 28, 2011

Other Attractions 
 San Roque West-San Roque East fish ponds
 Aspiras-Palispis Highway (formerly the Marcos Highway and Agoo-Baguio Road), connecting Agoo to Baguio City

Notable personalities 
 Congressman Jose D. Aspiras
 Archbishop Antonio L. Mabutas

Image gallery

References

External links

The History and founding of Agoo, La Union (Facebook)
Free Public Domain Images of Agoo beaches and surrounds (Facebook)
 [ Philippine Standard Geographic Code]
Philippine Census Information
Local Governance Performance Management System

Municipalities of La Union